Lah-Toh County was a county in Idaho Territory from 1864 to 1867.

Lah-Toh County was created by the Idaho Territorial Legislature in 1864 with Coeur d'Alene as its county seat. The name is Nez Perce for "the place of pine trees and pestle". The county was abolished in 1867. The portion of the county located south of the present Latah County line was transferred to Nez Perce County while the portion of the county north of Latah County joined Kootenai County.

The county was re-established in 1888 with different boundaries as Latah County.

See also
List of former United States counties
List of Idaho counties

References

Latah County at Idaho.gov
History of Latah County

1864 establishments in Idaho Territory
1867 disestablishments
Former counties of the United States
Pre-statehood history of Idaho